LDE(X) was one of the most mature LiteStep distributions, being developed almost continuously since 1999. It made its public debut with LDE R4 in October 1999 and the LDE-X R1.0 release marked a significant change in approach during 2000. It has always been provided according to the terms of the GPL and, currently, only runs on the Microsoft Windows 2000/XP operating systems.

LDE was originally styled to give Common Desktop Environment users a familiar-ish environment to work with Windows NT systems within both University and commercial facilities. Over subsequent versions, it evolved to be much more complex and to be based around a framework, named Core, comprising Microsoft Windows Script (JavaScript) code and LiteStep-supported script code. There is also support for Lua and Python code to be run in this framework. This wide-ranging support was a deliberate aim of the developer team because it allowed contributions and encourages extensions to the system. Localisation support is also provided within this framework, although it is not ideal due to limitations from the LiteStep system.

The framework simplifies common tasks with a suite of individual scripts that were designed to handle commonly occurring events. An example of a typical basis for this framework to exist is that each traditional LiteStep theme (user interface) author has historically either had to write his or her own code to save settings to files, or has, in the worst case, had to ask the user to directly edit the code. The LDE developers considered this to be an ease-of-use issue and for this and other cases, scripts were coded that eventually formed the LDE(X) Core framework.

The framework also provides support for the current in-vogue Open Theme Standard (version 2), OTS, used by the LiteStep community. This was a requested feature and also allows for such themes (user interfaces) to use parts of the LDE(X) SDK to extend their abilities when run on LDE(X).

The user interface was able to be chosen from a list of installed systems and is then loaded on top of this framework. User interfaces could load extensions (plugins) from a common repository. Each user using LDE(X) has their own configuration tree which is located in their own OS-provided 'Documents and Settings' folder, with the entire system being designed around multiple user operating systems.

LDE(X) was accompanied by a programme called OpenLDE, designed to allow for forks of the main distribution to (if they wish) be quickly recognised as an LDE(X)-derivative. This never saw adoption within the wider community, however.

The project was ended in May 2007. The 6.4.4 and 6.4.5 updates remain beta status, and only affect one feature in the system. It is not expected that there will be future updates, primarily due to the size of the community and also the system's dependence on components that were never open-sourced by developers and are only available for 32-bit Windows.

The web-site went offline in September 2016.

See also

 Shell (computing)
 Windows shell replacement

References

External links
 Main Website
 Project Website
 Open Theme Standard

Desktop shell replacement